Haughton Academy (formerly Haughton Community School) is a coeducational secondary school located in the Haughton-le-Skerne area of Darlington, County Durham, England.

Previously a community school administered by Darlington Borough Council, Haughton Community School converted to academy status in April 2012 and was renamed Haughton Academy. The school is now part of the Education Village Academy Trust, but continues to coordinate with Darlington Borough Council for admissions.

Haughton Academy is part of the Education Village, a £27 million campus that opened in Haughton-le-skerne, Darlington, in April 2006 and has an enrolment of 1358. Haughton Academy has a capacity of 900, Springfield Primary has 210 and Beaumont Hill has 248 students.
All of which are part of the Education Village. The Academy Trust involves Gurney Pease Academy and Marchbank free school and are in separate locations in the town. All together the Education Village Academy Trust has an enrolment of 1600. This also includes Beaumont Hill and Springfield Academy.

In mid 2019, Lord Theodore Agnew visited the school after it was selected to take part in a £24 million government initiative to improve education at the school, this includes a new MUGA that is being built. The funds for this initiative are coming from sugar taxes and being re-invested in healthy schemes such as this.
The parliamentary Lord was shown plans for the new multi-use outdoor sport pitch to be built at the Education Village to be used by the 3 schools and the community (Who have access to the village on an evening).

As of October 2019, construction  has started on the new sport area and is due to be completed at Christmas.

References

External links
Haughton Academy official website

Secondary schools in the Borough of Darlington
Academies in the Borough of Darlington
Schools in Darlington
Educational institutions established in 1958
1958 establishments in England